Erythrodiplax bromeliicola is a species of dragonfly in the family Libellulidae. It is found in Cuba and Jamaica. Its natural habitat is subtropical or tropical moist lowland forests. It is threatened by habitat loss.

References

Libellulidae
Odonata of North America
Insects of Cuba
Insects of Jamaica
Taxonomy articles created by Polbot
Insects described in 2000